"Tap the Bottle" is a song by American hip hop group Young Black Teenagers. It was released on November 24, 1992, via Sound of Urban Listeners (SOUL)/MCA Records as the lead single from YBT's second studio album Dead Enz Kidz Doin' Lifetime Bidz. Production was handled by Terminator X.

The single peaked at number 5 in the Official New Zealand Top 40 Singles, number 39 on the UK Singles Chart and number 55 on the Billboard Hot 100. It was certified Platinum by the Recorded Music NZ in 1993 for selling 10,000 units in New Zealand. The song remains Young Black Teenagers' most successful recording to date.

Track listing
"Tap the Bottle" (Album version) - 4:00
"Tap the Bottle" (Instrumental) - 4:01

Personnel
Ron "Kamron" Winge – main artist, songwriter
Adam "Firstborn" Wayne – main artist, songwriter
Scott "DJ Skribble" Ialacci – main artist, scratches
Norman "Terminator X" Rogers – songwriter, producer
Flex – songwriter
Shorty – songwriter
Vladimir "Vlado" Meller – mastering

Charts

Weekly charts

Year-end charts

Certifications

References

External links

1992 songs
1992 singles
Hip hop songs
MCA Records singles